The Anglican Church of St Mary the Virgin in Stanton Drew, Somerset, England, was built in the 13th century. It is a Grade II* listed building.

In the north aisle is the Norman bowl of the font and further east the small turret steps behind a glass door that in earlier times led up into a rood loft. Although parts date from the 13th and 14th centuries the interior, as it is seen today, shows the work that was carried out in 1847 when the south, west and north walls were rebuilt except a portion east from the Lady Chapel. The nave and tower arches were reconstructed in the 15th century.

The Hazle, Wight Preston and several other unidentified monuments in the churchyard are also listed, along with the piers, gates and overthrow at the north-east entrance to churchyard.

See also
 List of ecclesiastical parishes in the Diocese of Bath and Wells

References

13th-century church buildings in England
Church of England church buildings in Bath and North East Somerset
Grade II* listed churches in Somerset
Grade II* listed buildings in Bath and North East Somerset